Peter Huck (born 10 June 1955) is a German lightweight rower. He won a gold medal at the 1976 World Rowing Championships in Villach with the lightweight men's eight.

References

1955 births
Living people
German male rowers
World Rowing Championships medalists for West Germany